Eva Ionesco (born 18 July 1965) is a French actress, film director and screenwriter. She is the daughter of Romanian-French photographer Irina Ionesco and came to international prominence as a child model after being featured in her mother's works.

Early life
Ionesco was born to photographer Irina Ionesco, a Frenchwoman of Romanian descent, who had a relationship with a Hungarian man who worked in the military. Prior to Ionesco's birth, her mother had worked as a contortionist as she had come from a family of circus performers on her maternal side. Her parents separated when she was 3 at which point Ionesco became estranged from her father.

In 1977 her mother lost custody of her and Ionesco lived for a time with the parents of footwear designer Christian Louboutin who had already left home.
 
From the age of 13 Ionesco became a regular club-goer at Le Palace along with Christian Louboutin and Edwige Belmore and also developed a drug habit. She was in and out of various foster homes until an older boyfriend of hers took custody of her at the age of 16.

Career
At the age of 5, Eva became her mother's favorite photo model. Irina Ionesco's erotic photographs of her young daughter Eva have been a source of controversy since they first appeared in the 1970s. Eva also modeled for other photographers such as Jacques Bourboulon.

She is the youngest model ever to appear in a Playboy nude pictorial, since she was featured at age 11 in the October 1976 issue of the Italian edition of the magazine in a set by Bourboulon. In that picture, she posed nude at a beach. Another of her nude pictorials, in the November 1978 issue of the Spanish edition of Penthouse, was a selection of her mother's photographs. She also appeared on the cover page of Der Spiegel at the age of 12 completely nude. The issue was later expunged from the magazine's records.

Eva Ionesco made her film début at the age of 11 in 1976, playing a child in Roman Polanski's film The Tenant. A short time later she was cast in films of the mid-1970s such as Maladolescenza (also known as Puppy Love).

Eva claimed her story served as inspiration for Louis Malle's film Pretty Baby. In the 1980s, she attended the prestigious acting school Amandiers, directed by Patrice Chéreau and Pierre Romans.

Directorial career
Ionesco began directing in 2006.

In 2011 she directed her first full-length feature film, My Little Princess, which debuted at the 2011 Cannes Film Festival. The film, loosely inspired by Ionesco's personal life, starred Isabelle Huppert as a predatory photographer who uses her young daughter as a model in a series of nude photos.

Ionesco again paired with Isabelle Huppert for her next film, Golden Youth, about a young couple in Paris who begin to spend time with a much older and wealthier couple.

Writing career
In 2015 Ionesco's husband Simon Liberati released a book about their courtship and her childhood called Eva.

In 2017 Ionesco released her first book, Innocence, which dealt with her fractured relationship with her father.

Legal disputes
Since the time in which her mother lost custody of her for repeatedly photographing or allowing Ionesco to be photographed by others completely nude, Ionesco has been engaged in protracted court battles with her mother to censor and reclaim the images taken of her as a child.

She tried three times to sue her mother for emotional distress, and the trial is still going on through various courts in France. In 1998 the French police confiscated from her mother's apartment hundreds of photographs in which she appears at the age of five in suggestive poses and in complete nudity.

In 2012 Eva sued her mother for taking pornographic photos of her as a child. Although much of her claim was denied, she did receive some compensation.

Personal life
In 1995 Ionesco gave birth to a son, actor Lukas Ionesco.

Ionesco has been married to author Simon Liberati since 2013.

Filmography

As actress
Twice Upon a Time (2019, directed by Guillaume Nicloux) – Annie Arron
Les déferlantes (2013, directed by Éléonore Faucher) – Lili 
Crime (2010, directed by Vincent Ostria) – Ella
La famille Wolberg (2009, directed by Axelle Ropert) – Sarah, Joseph's Friend
A l'est de moi  (2008, directed by Bojena Horackova)
J'ai rêvé sous l'eau (2008, directed by Hormoz) – Femme Sif
Je vous hais petites filles (2008, directed by Yann Gonzalez) – Punk Idol
Comédie sentimentale (2008, directed by Emily Barnett) – Marylin
La promenade (2007, directed by Marina De Van) – The Prostitute #1
La petite fille sous l'océan (2006, directed by Nathalie Giraud) – Anaïs
Les invisibles (2005, directed by Thierry Jousse) – Vanessa
Écoute le temps (2005, directed by Alanté Alfandari) – Mme Bourmel
Quand je serai star (2004, directed by Patrick Mimouni) – Alice
Qui perd gagne! (2003,directed by Laurent Benegui) – The Deauville Gambler
L’empreinte (2003, directed by David Mathieu-Mahias) – Anna Yordanoff
That Woman (2003, directed by Guillaume Nicloux) – Mme Kopmans
Un homme, un vrai (2003, directed by Arnaud & Jean-Marie Larrieu) – The Producer
Je suis votre homme aka Eros thérapie (2003, directed by Danièle Dubroux) – Hélène
Il est plus facile pour un chameau... (2002, directed by Valeria Bruni Tedeschi) – A Woman at Cinema
Les diable (2002, directed by Christophe Ruggia)
Un aller simple (2001, directed by Laurent Heynemann) – Clémentine
Paris mon petit corps est bien las de ce grand monde (2000, directed by Francoise Prenant) – Agathe's Friend
L'Oncle Paul (2000, directed by Gérard Vergez) – Colombe
Adieu, plancher des vaches!  (1999, directed by Otar Iosseliani) – A Prostitute
La patinoire (1999, directed by Jean-Philippe Toussaint) – The Editor
Maison de famille (1999, (TV) directed by Serge Moati) – Sandra
La nouvelle Eve (1998, directed by Catherine Corsini) – A Woman of the PS
Rien que des grandes personnes (1997, directed by Jean-Marc Brondolo)
Vive la république! (1997, directed by Éric Rochant) – Victor's Woman
La petite maman (1997, directed by Patrice Martineau) – The Swimming Teacher
Liberté chérie (1996, directed by Jean-Luc Gaget)
Romaine (1996, directed by Agnès Obadia) – Pastelle
L'appartement (1996, directed by Gilles Mimouni) – A Woman at Travel Agency
Encore (1996, directed by Pascal Bonitzer) – Olga
Romaine et les filles (1995, directed by Agnès Obadia)
Pullman paradis (1995, directed by Michèle Rosier) – Marie-Paule Daragnès
Maigret: Cécile est morte (1994, (TV) directed by Denys de la Patellière) – Florence Boynet
Bête de scène (1994, directed by Bernard Nissile) – One of the Daughters
X pour Xana (1994, directed by Dominic Gould)
Montparnasse-Pondichéry (1993, directed by Yves Robert) – Colette
Rupture(s) (1993, directed by Christine Citti) – Anna
Grand bonheur (1993, directed by Hervé Le Roux) – Emma
Comment font les gens? (1992, directed by Pascale Bailly) – Emmanuelle
La sévillane (1992, directed by Jean-Philippe Toussaint) – Pascale's Friend
La table d'émeraude (1992, directed by Pierre Bourgeade)
Chant de guerre parisien (1991, directed by Laetitia Masson)
Monsieur (1990, directed by Jean-Philippe Toussaint) – Mme Ponz-Romanov
 (1989, directed by Jacques Rouffio) – Margaret

Marie cherchait l'amour (1989, directed by Sylvie Matton)
Résidence surveillée (1987, directed by Frédéric Compain)
L'amoureuse (1987, directed by Jacques Doillon) – Elsa
Hôtel de France (1986, directed by Patrice Chéreau) – Katia, the Waitress
Jeux d'artifices (1986, directed by Virginie Thévenet) – Eva
Grenouilles (1985, directed by Adolfo Arrieta) – Kati
Les Nanas (1984, directed by Annick Lanoë) – Miss France
La Nuit porte-jarretelles (1984, directed by Virginie Thévenet)
Meurtres à domicile (1981, directed by Marc Lobet) – Pauline
L'amant de poche (1978, directed by Bernard Queysanne) – Martine
Maladolescenza (1977, directed by Pier Giuseppe Murgia) – Silvia
Le locataire (1976, directed by Roman Polanski) – Bettina, Mme Gaderian's Daughter
Spermula (1976, directed by Charles Matton)

As director
 La loi de la forêt (2006)
 My Little Princess (2010)
 Golden Youth (2019)

Theatrical work
La voix humaine by Jean Cocteau (directed by M. Mastor)
Lola et toi et moi (directed by N. Schmidt)
Penthésilée & La petite Catherine Heilbronn (1987) by Heinrich von Kleist (either directed by Pierre Romans)
Platonov (1987) by Anton Chekhov (directed by Patrice Chéreau) – Zézette
Le retour au désert (1988) by Bernard-Marie Koltès (directed by Patrice Chéreau)
Le conte d'hiver (1988) by William Shakespeare (directed by Luc Bondy) – Mopsa
Chroniques d'une fin d'après-midi (1988) by Anton Chekov (directed by Pierre Romans)
Ecrit sur l'eau (1991) by Eric Emmanuel Schmitt  (directed by Niels Arestrup)
Le sang des fraises (1992) by Catherine Bidaut (directed by Daniel Pouthier)

References

External links
 
 
 "Eva Ionesco pictured by Irina Ionesco" 

 «Eva Ionesco in instagram

1965 births
Living people
Actresses from Paris
French film actresses
French stage actresses
French child actresses
French people of Romanian descent
French television actresses
20th-century French actresses
21st-century French actresses
French film directors
French women film directors
French women screenwriters
French screenwriters
French child models